Buinerveen is a village in the Dutch province of Drenthe. It is a part of the municipality of Borger-Odoorn, and lies about 18 km north of Emmen.

The village was first mentioned in 1762 as Bunerveen, and means "raised bog belonging to Buinen". Buinerveen was a former peat colony. Later it developed into an agricultural community.

Buinerveen was home to 205 people in 1840.

References

Populated places in Drenthe
Borger-Odoorn